The Revolutionary may refer to:

 The Revolutionary (1965 film), Canadian satirical film by Jean Pierre Lefebvre
 The Revolutionary (1970 film), American political drama film by Paul Williams
 The Revolutionary: Samuel Adams, 2022 biography by Stacy Schiff